Gertrudes "Tuding" Lozada (born 1943) is a Filipino former swimmer. She competed in two events at the 1956 Summer Olympics. She was inducted to the Philippine Sports Hall of Fame in July 2021.

References

External links
 

1943 births
Living people
Filipino female swimmers
Olympic swimmers of the Philippines
Swimmers at the 1956 Summer Olympics
Place of birth missing (living people)
Asian Games medalists in swimming
Asian Games silver medalists for the Philippines
Asian Games bronze medalists for the Philippines
Swimmers at the 1958 Asian Games
Swimmers at the 1962 Asian Games
Swimmers at the 1966 Asian Games
Medalists at the 1958 Asian Games
Medalists at the 1962 Asian Games
Medalists at the 1966 Asian Games
Philippine Sports Hall of Fame inductees